Santa Marta (sometimes spelled Santa Martha) is a station along Line A of the Mexico City Metro.  It is located in the Colonia Ermita Zaragoza  neighborhood of the Iztapalapa borough in Mexico City.

The logo of the station depicts a silhouette of Saint Martha with a pitcher in her hands.

Exits
Northwest: Generalísimo Morelos street and Rocha and Pardiñas streets, Col. Ermita Zaragoza
Northeast: Generalísimo Morelos street and Galeana street, Col. Ermita Zaragoza
Southeast: Calzada Ignacio Zaragoza, Col. Lomas de Zaragoza

Ridership

References

External links
 

Mexico City Metro Line A stations
Railway stations opened in 1991
1991 establishments in Mexico
Mexico City Metro stations in Iztapalapa
Accessible Mexico City Metro stations